The Diocese of Cardica (Latin: Dioecesis Cardicensis) was a Roman Catholic diocese located in the town of Cardica in the Thessaly region of Greece. In 1389, it was suppressed. It was later revived as a titular episcopal see.

Ordinaries

Diocese of Cardica
Erected: 1208
Latin Name: Cardicensis

Luca, O.S.M. (22 Dec 1363 Appointed – )

Suppressed: 1389

See also
Catholic Church in Greece

References

Former Roman Catholic dioceses in Greece
Medieval Thessaly